The Slovenian Parliament is the informal designation of the general representative body of the Slovenian nation and the legislative body of the Republic of Slovenia.

According to the Constitution of Slovenia, the general representative body of the Slovenian nation is the National Assembly. The general public in Slovenia often refer to the National Assembly alone as the Slovenian Parliament. However, the National Council, the representative body of basic social groups, also performs a further, if minor, part of the legislative function.

The opinions of experts and of the general Slovenian public on whether the Slovenian Parliament is bicameral or unicameral differ, although most consider it to be incompletely bicameral. In 2008, the Constitutional Court of Slovenia recognized the Slovenian Parliament as incompletely bicameral.

Seat

The National Assembly and the National Council convene in a modernist palace known as the "Slovenian Parliament" and sited in Republic Square, Ljubljana. It was built between 1954 and 1959 by the architect . An unrealized project for a Slovenian Parliament building, designed by the architect Jože Plečnik in the late 1940s, features on the Slovenian euro coins.

See also
Politics of Slovenia
List of legislatures by country

References

External links

 National Assembly
 National Council

 
Slovenia
Politics of Slovenia
Government of Slovenia
Slovenia
Slovenia